A concert is a form of musical performance.

Concert may also refer to:

Books
The Concert (play), 1909 play and basis for later films
The Concert (Kadare), 1988 novel  by Ismail Kadare

Film and TV
The Concert (1921 film), a lost 1921 silent comedy film
The Concert (1931 film), a 1931 German comedy film
The Concert (1961 film), an Australian film
Le Concert, a 2009 film directed by Radu Mihăileanu

Music
House concert, a private live music event
The Concert (ballet), a 1956 ballet by Jerome Robbins

Albums
The Concert (Creedence Clearwater Revival album), 1980
The Concert (Barbra Streisand album), 1994
Concert: The Cure Live, a 1984 album by The Cure
Kontsert or Концерт, a 1987 album by Billy Joel
Concerts (Keith Jarrett album), a 1981 album by Keith Jarrett
Concerts (Henry Cow album), a 1976 album by Henry Cow
Le concert (Alain Souchon and Laurent Voulzy album), 2016
Le concert (Vianney album), 2018

Other uses

Concert Communications Services, a telecom firm
Operation Concert, a 1943 operation by Soviet partisans during the World War II
The Concert (ter Borch), a painting by Dutch artist Gerard ter Borch
The Concert (Titian), a painting by Italian artist Titian
The Concert (Vermeer), a painting by Dutch painter Johannes Vermeer
Concert Properties, a real estate company headquartered in Vancouver, British Columbia

See also
Concerto, a form of composition in classical music
Consort (disambiguation)